G. alba  may refer to:
 Gentiana alba, the pale gentian, white gentian or cream gentian, a herbaceous flowering plant species
 Geocrinia alba, the white-bellied frog, a small frog species found in Southwest Australia
 Gygis alba, the white tern, a small seabird species found across the tropical oceans of the world

See also
 Alba (disambiguation)